Geoffrey Dearmer  (21 March 1893 – 18 August 1996) was a British poet. He was the son of Anglican liturgist and hymnologist Percy Dearmer and the artist and writer Mabel Dearmer.

School and university life
Stephen Gwynn, a writer closely associated with Dearmer's family, recorded that Dearmer had disliked school but blossomed at university:
I have seen a boy who was consistently and persistently and indomitably unhappy during all the phases of his school life, turn into a creature radiant, walking on air, swimming in felicity, from the moment that he became an undergraduate. Bliss lasted for two years and then there was trouble about exams: but Geoffrey Dearmer – for he is my example – had got as much as anyone I ever knew of the real Oxford teaching, which is given by the atmosphere and surroundings and associations and companionships of the place.

Service in the First World War
Dearmer served first (in 1915) with the Royal Fusiliers at Gallipoli, where his younger brother, Christopher, a pilot with RNAS, had been recently killed in action, and then with the Royal Army Service Corps on the Western Front in France. Dearmer's mother, Mabel, died in Serbia while serving as a paramedic with a Red Cross ambulance unit, for which her husband, the Revd Percy Dearmer, was acting as chaplain.

Dearmer was appointed a lieutenant in the Royal Victorian Order (RVO).

Civilian career
From 1936 to 1958 Dearmer was Examiner of Plays in the Lord Chamberlain's office. Simultaneously he served as Editor of the BBC radio Children's Hour programme.  In this capacity, he wrote the introduction in 1960 for W. R. Dalzell's Living Artists of the Eighteenth Century (Hutchinson & Co., London). In 1935 his sci-fi novel They Chose to Be Birds appeared (Heinemann, London, 1935).

Legacy
Dearmer died at the age of 103. The Geoffrey Dearmer Award for new poets was founded in his memory in 1998.

Poetic works
Many of Dearmer's war poems dealt with the overall brutality of war and violence, to which he was a direct eyewitness. These poems enjoyed a brief popularity during and immediately after World War I but were later overshadowed by the starker works of other war poets such as Wilfred Owen and Siegfried Sassoon. Dearmer's poems were never infused with anger or despair and often revealed his unshakable Christian faith.

Dearmer was also a poet of nature. A critic who knew him well rated his garden poetry as highly as his war poems, quoting these lines as an example:

Collections
 Poems, 1918
 A Day's Delight, 1923
 A Pilgrim's Song, John Murray, 1993

References

External links
Article about Dearmer in Dutch Daily NRC Handelsblad
 

1893 births
1996 deaths
British poets
English centenarians
British World War I poets
20th-century British male writers
Royal Fusiliers officers
British Army personnel of World War I
Lieutenants of the Royal Victorian Order
British male poets
Royal Army Service Corps officers
Men centenarians